Mesnilomyia is a genus of parasitic flies in the family Tachinidae. There are about six described species in Mesnilomyia.

Species
These six species belong to the genus Mesnilomyia:
 Mesnilomyia achilleae Kugler, 1972
 Mesnilomyia calyptrata Zeegers, 2007
 Mesnilomyia longicornis Kugler, 1972
 Mesnilomyia magnifica Kugler, 1972
 Mesnilomyia rufipes Zeegers, 2007
 Mesnilomyia subaperta Herting, 1983

References

Further reading

 
 
 
 

Tachinidae
Articles created by Qbugbot